The University of Wuppertal (Universität Wuppertal) is a German scientific institution, located in Wuppertal, in the state of North Rhine-Westphalia, Germany.

The university's official name in German is Bergische Universität Wuppertal, or BUW. It was founded in 1972. In 2014/15, approx. 20,000 students were enrolled in a wide range of subjects with many interdisciplinary linkages between a total of 7 faculties.

Organization
Division A: Humanities and Cultural Studies
Division B: Schumpeter School of Business and Economics
Division C: Mathematics and Natural Sciences
Division D: Architecture, Civil Engineering Mechanical Engineering, Safety
Division E: Electrical Engineering, Information Technology, Media Technology
Division F: Design and Art
Division G: Education and Social Sciences

Campus
The main building of the University of Wuppertal is located in the suburb of Elberfeld on Grifflenberg. The university now has 3 campuses:
	Campus Grifflenberg (main campus) in Elberfeld, Wuppertal
	Campus Freudenberg in Elberfeld, Wuppertal
	Campus Haspel in Unterbarmen, Wuppertal

All three campuses house specific parts of the University Library of Wuppertal, the main library at Campus Grifflenberg holds five specific libraries.

From 2004 until 2010, the University of Wuppertal was home to the second supercomputer at a German university. ALiCEnext, the supercomputer, was designed as a cluster and consisted of 512 so-called Blades. ALiCEnext was used in the field of elementary particle physics, applied computer science, astro-particle physics and experimental high energy physics.

Notable professors

The university employs more than 250 professors (as of 2014). Notable people who have taught in Wuppertal are:

 Bazon Brock, art theorist
 Gerd Faltings, mathematician
 Lev Kopelev, writer and historian of literature
 Karl-Heinz Petzinka, architect
 Dieter Vieweger, archaeologist
 Paul J. J. Welfens, economist (current)

Notable alumni
 Christian Boros (born 1964), German advertising agency founder and art collector
 Godela Habel, abstract painter
 Walter Heidenfels, industrial designer

Awards and rankings

International rankings

Shanghai Ranking placed the University of Wuppertal between 404th and 502nd overall as compared to other international collegiate programs. However, the Physics program in particular is ranked somewhat higher, being placed between the 101st and 150th places in 2013 and between 151st and 200th in 2014.

The Times Higher Education World University Rankings placed the University of Wuppertal in the 501–600th bracket in its World University Rankings 2020, and 201+ in the European Teachings Rankings 2019.

In 2016, CWUR ranked University of Wuppertal as the 909th best university overall within its list of top 1000 international universities. In 2017 its place raised to 844th in the same list.

National rankings

At the CHE ranking, which evaluated more than 300 universities in the German-speaking world on the basis of the judgments of more than 250,000 students, University of Wuppertal was awarded three times. In 2011 the university reached the top group in eleven of the 13 categories. With a total score of 1.9, the Faculty of Economics was above the nationwide average of 2.6.

References

External links

  

 
Wuppertal
Educational institutions established in 1972
1972 establishments in Germany